Nerice bidentata, the base-streaked prominent moth or double-toothed prominent moth, is a moth of the  family Notodontidae. It is found in from Nova Scotia to Florida, west to Texas and north to Saskatchewan.

The wingspan is 30–40 mm. Adults have a two-coloured forewing. The lower half is greyish brown and the upper half is light to dark brown. These are separated by a doubly toothed blackish band with a variable white edging. The hindwings are brown, although somewhat darker toward the margin. They are on wing from April to September and again from May to August in one generation per year in the north.

The larvae feed on the leaves of Ulmus species. They are chalky-green and are similar to the leaf edges of the host plant. Larvae can be found from June to October.

Gallery

References

Moths described in 1855
Notodontidae
Moths of North America